The Sorrell Hiperlight is a family of single and two seat, negative stagger biplanes, designed for amateur construction.

Development
The single seat SNS-8 Hiperlight was designed by the Sorrell brothers in 1982 at the request of the US Rotax engine distributor to provide an enclosed cockpit aircraft design to utilize the  Rotax 277 engine. The resulting aircraft was a scaled-down version of the very successful Sorrell Hiperbipe aerobatic cabin biplane and with an empty weight of  fit the US ultralight category. The series designation of "SNS" stands for Sorrell Negative Stagger.

The aircraft is described as easy to fly, with light control forces and well balanced controls. The aircraft has full-span ailerons on the bottom wing that droop together when the stick is pulled back, giving the same effect as flaps in the landing flare.

 is sufficient to power the design and it does not require larger engines. Since the Rotax 277 has been out of production for many years  engines such as the 2si 460 or Hirth F-33 are often used.

Design
The aircraft features a welded steel tube forward fuselage, with a detachable aluminium tube aft fuselage. The rear fuselage can be easily removed for transport or storage in ten minutes. The wings are also constructed from aluminium tubes and the whole aircraft is covered in aircraft fabric.

The SNS-8 kit was estimated as taking 200–300 hours to assemble.

Sunrise Aircraft developed the single seat SNS-8 into the SNS-9 two-seater. The SNS-9 uses the  Rotax 503 as its standard powerplant and had an optional Wankel engine available.

Variants

SNS-8
Single seat version
SNS-9
Two seat version
Hiperlight EXP
EXP II

Specifications (SNS-8)

See also

References

External links

Thunderbird Aviation archives on Archive.org
Photo of SNS-9 Hiperlight

Biplanes with negative stagger
Hiperlight
1980s United States ultralight aircraft
Single-engined tractor aircraft